Eunidia haplotrita is a species of beetle in the family Cerambycidae. It was described by Per Olof Christopher Aurivillius in 1911.

Subspecies
 Eunidia haplotrita var. albomarmorata Breuning, 1943
 Eunidia haplotrita var. densemarmorata Breuning, 1963

References

Eunidiini
Beetles described in 1911